Frank Rynne is an Irish-born singer, record producer, art curator, film-maker, writer, and historian. He has played in three bands Those Handsome Devils in 1984, The Baby Snakes (1985-1994) and Islamic Diggers (1996- ). He has produced three CDs of Moroccan folk music by the Master Musicians of Joujouka. In 1992 Rynne co-organised The Here to Go Show, an international art show featuring the works of William S. Burroughs and Brion Gysin and, with fellow organisers Joe Ambrose and Terry Wilson, co-wrote Man from Nowhere. He co-produced the CD 10%: file under Burroughs (1996).

Early years 
Rynne first came to national prominence in Ireland playing rhythm guitar with Those Handsome Devils, a Dublin-based rockabilly band with a large national following. In 1985 he formed The Baby Snakes, a rock'n'roll band strongly influenced by The New York Dolls and Alex Chilton. The Baby Snakes released an EP and two LPs, This City Sucks and Sweet Hunger, before moving to Brixton, London in 1988.

Their third and final LP was produced by Sex Pistols audio engineer, Dave Goodman. In 1990, the band recruited drummer Nigel Preston, a founder member of The Cult. After Preston's death in 1992, Rynne began to work on projects related to Burroughs and Gysin.

Further reading 
Ambrose, Joe; Wilson, Terry; and Rynne, Frank (1992). Man from Nowhere: Storming the Citadels of Enlightenment With William Burroughs and Brion Gysin. Autonomedia. .
Rynne, Frank (October 2005). "Paris Notes by Frank Rynne". The Handstand. Retrieved Jan. 14, 2007.

External links 
Master Musicians of Joujouka official site
Obituary of Hamri by Frank Rynne. The Independent, London, 19 October 2000
 Ira Cohen obituary by Frank Rynne. The Guardian (UK), May 13, 2011

Moroccan music
Irish male singers
Living people
Irish film directors
Irish film producers
Musicians from County Dublin
Year of birth missing (living people)